Gordon Albert Jockel  (4 June 192018 September 2015) was an Australian public servant and diplomat.

Jockel joined Australia's diplomatic service in 1944. Among other roles, he served in appointments as Permanent Representative to the United Nations Office in Geneva, Commissioner to Singapore, Ambassador to Indonesia and Ambassador to Thailand.

From February 1972 to 1977, Jockel was Director of the Joint Intelligence Organisation.

Jockel died on 18 September 2015.

Awards
In June 1964, Jockel was made an Officer of the Order of the British Empire. He was promoted to a Commander of the Order in the 1971 Queen's Birthday Honours.

References

1920 births
2015 deaths
Australian public servants
Ambassadors of Australia to Indonesia
Ambassadors of Australia to Thailand
High Commissioners of Australia to Singapore
University of Sydney alumni
Australian Commanders of the Order of the British Empire
Australian expatriates in Switzerland